Zalambur (alternate spelling Zalanboor) is one of the five sons of Iblis mentioned by Muslim ibn al-Hajjaj. He is a devil who presides over dishonest and fraudulent business transactions.  Said to have four brothers: Awar (اعور or لأعوار), Dasim (داسم), Sut (مسوط), and Tir (ثبر). Each of them is linked to a different psychological function which they try to encourage in order to prevent humans spiritual development.

References 

 Zalambur (Islamic) // Turner P., Coulter Ch. R. Dictionary of Ancient Deities — New York; London: Routledge, 2013. — x, 597 p. — P. 520. — , 

Demons in Islam